Dobře placená procházka (English title: Worth While or A Well Paid Walk) is a Czech musical and film.

History 
This "jazz opera" was written by Jiří Suchý and Jiří Šlitr. The play was directed by Ján Roháč, and had its premiere on 15 June 1965 at the Semafor Theatre. It was also performed at various theatres throughout Europe, in Finland, Belgium, and Yugoslavia. In 2007, the play was performed at the National Theatre in Prague.

Film 
Directed by Miloš Forman and Ján Pele.
Jiří Suchý as Postman
Eva Pilarová as Vanilka 
Jiří Šlitr as Advocate
René Gabzdyl as Uli
Hana Hegerová as Auntie from Liverpool

Productions

Divadlo Semafor, Praha 
Directed by Miloš Forman. Premiere: June 15, 1966.
Jiří Suchý as Postman
Eva Pilarová/Naďa Urbánková as Vanilka
Jiří Šlitr as Advocate
René Gabzdyl as Uli
Hana Hegerová/Naďa Urbánková as Aunt Brockefeller

National Theatre, Prague 
Directed by Miloš Forman and Petr Forman. Premiere: April 22, 2007.
Jiří Suchý/Petr Macháček/Zbyněk Fric as Postman
Dagmar Zázvůrková/Jana Malá as Vanilka
Petr Stach/Zbyněk Fric as Uli
Petr Píša/Tomáš Trapl/Lukáš Kumpricht as Advocate
Tereza Hálová/Zuzana Stivínová/Jitka Molavcová as Aunt from Liverpool
Jana Fabiánová/Beatrice Todorová/Irena Magnusková as Beautiful Girl
Miroslav Lacko/Petr Wajsar as Accordionist

External links 
Czechoslovak Film Database (2009)
Czechoslovak Film Database (1966)
National Theatre

Czech musical films
Czech plays
Czech musicals
1965 plays